"Forbidden Lover" is the fifteenth single by L'Arc-en-Ciel, released on October 14, 1998. It debuted at number 1 on the Oricon chart (replacing their previous single, "Snow Drop"), selling over 509,000 copies in the initial week of the release. The single was re-released on August 30, 2006.

Track listing

* Remix by Yukihiro.

References

1998 singles
L'Arc-en-Ciel songs
Oricon Weekly number-one singles
Songs written by Hyde (musician)
Songs written by Ken (musician)
1998 songs
Ki/oon Music singles